Hetman Ivan Mazepa may refer to:

 Ivan Mazepa, 1639–1709, a Ukrainian military, political, and civic leader 
 Ukrainian corvette Hetman Ivan Mazepa, an anti-submarine ship of the Ukrainian Navy